Michael Schmidt (born 6 August 1962) is a German former football player. He spent two seasons in the Bundesliga with Hamburger SV and SpVgg Blau-Weiß 1890 Berlin.

Honours 
 European Cup winner: 1983.
 Bundesliga champion: 1983.

External links 
 

1962 births
Living people
German footballers
Hamburger SV players
Bundesliga players
Footballers from Berlin
Association football defenders